Vievis is a small city in Elektrėnai municipality, Lithuania. It is located 14 km east of Elektrėnai, on Lake Vievis.

Its alternate names include Anastasevskaya, Jewie (Polish), Vevis, Vievio, Viyevis, V’yevis, and Yev’ye.

In 1522 year the Vievis manor, in 1539 year - town, which belonged to Ogiński family, was mentioned. In the first half of 16th century the first Catholic church was built there.

About 1600, Ogiński family built a Uniate church and founded the Abbey of the Holy Spirit (Lithuanian: Šventosios dvasios). At the beginning of the 17th century a printing press was established near the abbey, notable for printing books by various Protestant Calvinist scholars.

In 1794 and 1812, the church burned down and was rebuilt in 1816. In 1837 an Orthodox church was built.

In the period between World War I and World War II, after the Polish-Lithuanian War, Vievis was near the dividing line between Lithuania and Poland. The town used to be among those with the largest Polish population, with roughly 77% inhabitants identifying themselves as Poles. In 2011 census, only 10.9% of inhabitants identified themselves as Poles as well as 3.74% Russians and 82.56% Lithuanians.

The 17th century printing press became the reason why a 1970s samizdat journal "Lustra dzion" edited by Vincuk Viačorka cited "Jewie" as the place of its publishing (even though it was in fact published in Minsk). The printing press is also featured on the modern coat of arms of the city, adopted in 1999.

The Lithuanian Road Museum is in the city.

Twin towns
  Óbuda-Békásmegyer – Hungary, since 2016

Notes and references

Cities in Lithuania
Cities in Vilnius County
Elektrėnai Municipality
Trakai Voivodeship
Troksky Uyezd

In the 1800s there was a large Jewish population as there was throughout the Pale of Settlement. While exact dates are unknown, it is said that some time in 1943 or 1944, the German occupiers rounded up the remaining several thousand Jews, marched them to the forest where they were shot.
The remnants of the long time Jewish cemetery can be accessed through a gate in the divided highway built by the Russians in the 1960s. There is a simple plaque alongside the highway and barely recognizable remnants of a few graves, most of which were reputedly robbed for valuables.